Shaun Peter Derry (born 6 December 1977) is an English former professional footballer and manager who was most recently a first team coach for Premier League club Crystal Palace. He previously managed Notts County and Cambridge United, and played for Crystal Palace, Leeds United and Queens Park Rangers among other clubs. Derry was known for his hard-tackling and aggressive midfield style, and was primarily a defensive midfielder but could also play at right-back.

Playing career

Early career
Born in Nottingham, Derry started his career at Notts County as a trainee before being bought by Sheffield United in 1998 for a fee of £700,000. He scored once during his spell at Sheffield United, his goal coming in the FA Cup against Rushden & Diamonds.

Portsmouth
Derry was sold to Portsmouth in 2000 for £300,000. He was a regular in the side under both Tony Pulis and Steve Claridge before being made team captain by Graham Rix. After Rix's departure, Derry was amongst the many players deemed surplus to requirements by new manager Harry Redknapp in summer 2002 rebuilding and was sold to Crystal Palace for £400,001. He scored only once during his spell at Portsmouth, his goal coming in a crucial win over against West Bromwich Albion.

Crystal Palace
Derry helped Crystal Palace in their return to the Premier League in 2004, making 44 appearances including an appearance in the 2004 First Division play-off final. It was his corner that led to Darren Powell scoring a 90th-minute header to send the Eagles to extra-time in the semi-final, which they would win on penalties. He struggled to get into the team during the 2004–05 season and, after a loan spell at Nottingham Forest, Leeds signed him for an undisclosed amount in February 2005.

Leeds United
Derry's first goal for Leeds United came on his home debut against West Ham United, sealing a 2–1 victory against the Hammers. Derry was a regular in the Leeds starting eleven in season 2005–06, becoming a vital part of the squad as they pushed for promotion back into the Premier League and a cult hero with the Leeds fans for his passionate displays. Derry was part of the Leeds team which reached the Championship Playoff finals, but Leeds ended up on the wrong end of a 3–0 defeat to confine them to another season in the Championship. In August 2006 he pledged his future to the club, signing a contract extension until July 2009.

Leeds' manager Kevin Blackwell was sacked after a poor start to the 2006–07 season. In October 2006, new Leeds manager Dennis Wise revealed Derry as the new vice captain of the club, with Kevin Nicholls made captain. Derry was once again a regular in the Leeds team in the 2006–07 season. A hernia and Achilles tendon injury in January 2007 saw Derry being ruled out for the rest of the season. Derry's fitness returned the following season as Leeds prepared for life in League One. However, he did not feature for the club again and returned to former club Palace on loan in November 2007.

Back to Palace
Further doubts about the midfielder's future at the Elland Road club arose when it was reported that Derry had declined Wise's offer to return and feature in the home tie against Oldham Athletic on New Year's Day 2008 with Leeds' missing midfielders due to injuries. It was later revealed that it was actually manager Neil Warnock who blocked Derry's return to Leeds rather than Derry himself.

Shortly after his loan spell concluded, Derry made his move back to Palace a permanent one, signing for the club on a three-year deal. for £150,000.

In his second season back at the club he was named club captain after the departure of former captain Mark Hudson to Charlton. He held the position for the next two seasons.

In the 2009–10 season, Derry played every minute of every match for Crystal Palace. The season was an eventful one during which Palace were placed into administration, leading to the departure of Neil Warnock to Queens Park Rangers and a fight to avoid relegation to League One. This was finally achieved on the last day of the season, 2 May 2010 after an away 2–2 draw against Sheffield Wednesday.

Queens Park Rangers
Derry departed from Selhurst Park at the end of the season to reunite with Warnock at his new club Queens Park Rangers signing a two-year contract, on a free transfer, after his contract at Palace had expired. On 21 March 2012 Derry scored his first league goal for the club, and his only in the Premier League, in the 3–2 win over Liverpool. Derry, alongside his former Crystal Palace teammate Clint Hill, won much respect from QPR fans for his tireless work ethic and leadership on the pitch throughout the Championship title-winning season and the subsequent 2 years in the Premier League.

On 21 January 2013, Derry signed a one-year contract extension with QPR, keeping him at the club until 2014. On 8 August 2013, Derry joined Millwall on a 28-day loan.

Managerial career

Notts County
Derry was appointed manager at Notts County on 6 November 2013. Despite looking destined for relegation, Derry secured Notts's League One status with six wins from the last nine games, a draw on last day of season kept County up by three points. He was sacked on 23 March 2015 with Notts County one place above the relegation positions in League One on goal difference and having won only three games in their previous 24 league matches.

Cambridge United
Derry was appointed manager of League Two club Cambridge United on 12 November 2015. On 9 February 2018, following a poor run of form, Derry left the club by mutual consent.

Oxford United
In June 2018, Oxford United announced Derry's appointment as first-team coach, under manager Karl Robinson. Derry played, and scored a penalty, during a pre-season friendly victory over Irish club Longford Town in July 2018.

Crystal Palace
In September 2019, Derry returned to Crystal Palace as professional development coach in the club's academy system..

Derry was promoted to first team coach under manager Patrick Vieira, but left this role in January 2023.

Career statistics

Managerial statistics

Honours
Crystal Palace
Football League First Division play-offs: 2003–04

Queens Park Rangers
Football League Championship: 2010–11

Individual
League Two Manager of the Month: December 2015

References

External links

1967 births
Living people
Footballers from Nottingham
English footballers
Association football midfielders
Notts County F.C. players
Sheffield United F.C. players
Portsmouth F.C. players
Crystal Palace F.C. players
Nottingham Forest F.C. players
Leeds United F.C. players
Queens Park Rangers F.C. players
Millwall F.C. players
English Football League players
Premier League players
English football managers
Notts County F.C. managers
Cambridge United F.C. managers
Oxford United F.C. non-playing staff
Crystal Palace F.C. non-playing staff
English Football League managers
Association football coaches